Ozona is an unincorporated community in Pinellas County, Florida, United States, located  north of downtown Dunedin. Ozona has a post office with ZIP code 34660.

References

Unincorporated communities in Pinellas County, Florida
Unincorporated communities in Florida
Former municipalities in Florida